CF Rapa Nui is an association football team from Chile which represents the territory of Easter Island in association football. Their home games are played at the Estadio de Hanga Roa, which has a capacity of approximately 2,500 people.

Asociación de Fútbol de Isla de Pascua 

The Asociación de Fútbol de Isla de Pascua (AFIPA) is the Easter Island football association.

History
The team played two unofficial games against a team from the Juan Fernández Islands in 1996 and 2000, before playing its first official match on 5 August 2009, in the first round of the Copa Chile 2009; CF Rapa Nui lost 4–0 against Colo-Colo.

For its game against Colo-Colo the team was coached by former Chilean international Miguel Angel Gamboa, who spent several weeks honing the skills of the local players, as well as teaching them the basics of heading, shooting, and positioning.

In 2018, the team has competed at the "Festival des Îles" in Tahiti, finishing in 3rd position in the group (of five teams), with two wins, one loss and one draw.

Complete international

Competitive record

National Soccer Championship of Native Peoples

ConIFA South America Football Cup record

References

Football clubs in Chile
Association football clubs established in 2009
Hanga Roa
Sport in Valparaíso Region
2009 establishments in Easter Island
CONIFA member associations